Leonard Leisching (11 September 1934 – 25 February 2018) was a boxer from South Africa, bronze medalist at the 1952 Summer Olympics in Helsinki and gold medalist at the 1954 British Empire and Commonwealth Games in Vancouver, British Columbia. Leisching was also an accomplished footballer, appearing as a full-back for Johannesburg Rangers, Wigan Athletic, Llandudno and Southern Suburbs.

1952 Olympic boxing tournament results
 Round of 32:  defeated Emmanuel Agassi (Iran) 3-0;
 Round of 16: defeated Stevan Redli (Yugoslavia) 3-0;
 Quarterfinal: defeated Leonard Walters (Canada) 3-0;
 Semifinal: lost to Jan Zachara (Czechoslovakia) 2-1.

Starting at the 1952 Olympic boxing tournament, both losing semifinalists in all divisions received bronze medals. Leisching's first-round opponent, Emmanuel Agassi, is the father of tennis champion Andre Agassi.

References

External links

1934 births
2018 deaths
Featherweight boxers
Olympic boxers of South Africa
Olympic bronze medalists for South Africa
Boxers at the 1952 Summer Olympics
Boxers at the 1956 Summer Olympics
Boxers at the 1954 British Empire and Commonwealth Games
Commonwealth Games gold medallists for South Africa
Olympic medalists in boxing
Medalists at the 1952 Summer Olympics
South African soccer players
Rangers F.C. (South Africa) players
South African male boxers
Commonwealth Games medallists in boxing
Association football defenders
Southern Suburbs F.C. players
Medallists at the 1954 British Empire and Commonwealth Games